Nothing Without You is the second studio album from Contemporary Gospel singer Smokie Norful. The album was released on October 5, 2004 through EMI Gospel. In 2005, a Special Edition which included a DVD was released.

Track listing 
All songs written by Smokie Norful, except where noted.

 "Power" (Cedric Caldwell, Victor Caldwell, Norful) - 3:55
 "Power" (Reprise) feat. Darrell Petties - 1:09
 "Worthy" (Percy Bady, Norful) - 4:50
 "God Is Able" - 4:12
 "I Understand" (Bady) - 4:06
 "I Know the Lord Will Make a Way" (Public Domain) - 5:46
 "In the Middle" - 4:09
 "Can't Nobody" (Josiah Bell, Norful) - 3:24
 "Nothing Without You" - 3:55
 "Continuous Grace" - 3:19
 "I Know Too Much About Him" (Antonio Dixon, Norful) - 5:53
 "Healing in His Tears" (Myron Butler, Norful) - 7:08

Awards 
At the 36th GMA Dove Awards, the song "In the Middle" was nominated to a Dove Award for Contemporary Gospel Recorded Song of the Year.

Chart performance 
The album peaked at #57 on Billboard 200, #15 on Billboard's R&B/Hip-Hop Albums, #4 on Billboard's Christian Albums, and #1 on Billboard's Gospel Albums. It stayed 103 weeks on the Gospel Albums charts, 72 weeks on the Christian Albums chart, and 63 weeks on the R&B/Hip-Hop charts. Also, the songs "God Is Able" peaked at #11 on Billboard's Gospel Songs.

References

External links 
 Nothing Without You in Amazon.com

2004 albums
Smokie Norful albums